St Farnan's is a Gaelic Athletic Association club based in west County Sligo, Republic of Ireland. It was formed from the amalgamation of two local clubs, Dromore West and Templeboy in 1964.

As of 2022, it was competing as a Sligo Senior Football Championship club, for the first time since the 2012 season.

Honours

 Sligo Intermediate Football Championship: (1)
 2007
 Sligo Junior Football Championship: (4)
 1972, 1983, 1997, 2005
 Sligo Under 20 Football Championship: (2)
 1995, 1997 (amalgamated with Easkey)
 Sligo Intermediate Football League Division 3 (ex Div. 2): (1)
 2011
 Sligo Junior Football League (Division 5): (3)
 1982, 1986, 1997
 Benson Cup: (5)
 1995, 1996, 1997, 2002, 2016, 2019

References

Gaelic games clubs in County Sligo